The Leszczyński Residence (Kamienica Leszczynski) - also called the Prażmowski, Pastoriusa, Rautenstrauchów or Dobrycza - is a rococo-classical townhouse at 87 Krakowskie Przedmieście, in Warsaw.

Appearance

The main facade has a decorated portal, openwork balconies with balustrades. Dating from the lattice of the coat of arms of the Leszczynski's.

History

It was built between 1734 and 1743 for Joachim Pastorius, a doctor and royal historian, as a four-storied facade. Since the mid-17th century it was owned by Warsaw juror K. Waltera, and from 1666 by Mikołaj Prażmowski, the Crown Chancellor and Polish Primate.

In 1754, after being purchased by the Leszczynski family, it was rebuilt as a rococo palace with a five-story facade, designed by Jakub Fontana. From Senatorska Street, it is the second home frontage in classical style. A new segment at the southern part of the building was built before 1795.

It then passed into the hands of the Rautenstrauchów family. In 1804 it was bought by merchant Stefana Dobrycza.

Partially destroyed in 1944, and demolished for the construction of a major through route, it was rebuilt as it looked in the late 18th century, based on the design of Zygmunt Stępiński. In 2002-2003, it was restored.

Internally it is connected to the adjacent Johna Residence - the "House of Literature" (Polish Writers' Union).

Bibliography

 Bartłomiej Kaczorowski: Encyklopedia Warszawy. Warszawa: Wydawnictwo Naukowe PWN, 1994. . (in Polish)
 Jerzy S. Majewski: Warszawa nieodbudowana. Królestwo Polskie 1815-1840. Warszawa: VEDA, 2009. . (in Polish)
 Images of the residence from 1939 (in Polish)

External links

Rococo architecture in Warsaw
Rebuilt buildings and structures in Poland